Barbados sent five athletes to the 2011 World Championships in Athletics in Daegu, South Korea.
The team was led by the defending 100m hurdles world champion Ryan Brathwaite.

Results

Men

Women

References

External links
Official local organising committee website
Official IAAF competition website

Nations at the 2011 World Championships in Athletics
2011
World Championships in Athletics